The Aldabra drongo (Dicrurus aldabranus) is a species of bird in the drongo family Dicruridae.
It is endemic to Seychelles, where it occurs only on the island of Aldabra. It has a small population of only around 1000 birds.

The appearance of this species is typical for drongos, with entirely black plumage, a heavy bill and a red eye. The tail is long and forked. Juvenile birds have a grey back, lighter blotched undersides and a brown eye. Its call is a harsh chuckle.

Its natural habitats are tropical mangrove forests and cassurina woodland and dense scrub.

References

Birds of Seychelles
Drongos
Endemic fauna of Seychelles
Birds described in 1893
Taxa named by Robert Ridgway
Taxonomy articles created by Polbot